Glaucochroite is a calcium manganese nesosilicate mineral with formula . It occurs in metamorphosed limestones.

It was first described in 1899 in Franklin Furnace, Sussex County, New Jersey.

References 
 Webmineral.com
 Handbook of Mineralogy

Calcium minerals
Manganese(II) minerals
Nesosilicates
Orthorhombic minerals
Minerals in space group 62
Minerals described in 1899